Roger Mynors Swinfen Eady, 3rd Baron Swinfen,  (14 December 1938 – 5 June 2022) was a British politician and philanthropist, who was one of the ninety two hereditary peers elected to remain in the House of Lords following the passing of the House of Lords Act 1999. He sat as a Conservative.

Early life and education
Swinfen was born in 1938, the elder son of Charles Swinfen Eady, second Baron Swinfen and his novelist wife Mary Wesley.  His parents divorced in 1945.  He was educated at Westminster School and at the Royal Military Academy, Sandhurst, after which he received a Short Service Commission in The Royal Scots before leaving the British Army in the rank of Lieutenant.

Later life
A philanthropist, he was the Founding Trustee of the Swinfen Charitable Trust and was Director of the American Telemedicine Association from 2009 until 2013.

Swinfen was President of the South East Region British Sports Association for the Disabled and 
between 1983 and 1997, he served as a Member of the Direct Mail Services Standards Board. In 1988, he became Patron of the Disablement Income Group, in 1996, Patron of Labrador Rescue South East, in 2002, Patron of World Orthopaedic Concern, and of the Kunde Foundation in 2007.

Swinfen was a Liveryman of the Worshipful Company of Drapers as well as a Freeman of the City of London.

House of Lords
Swinfen became the third Baron Swinfen on the death of his father in 1977.  As a member of the House of Lords, he was a member on various UK Parliamentary Committees.

Marriage and children
Swinfen married Patricia Anne Blackmore on 24 October 1962.  They had four children:

 Hon Georgina Mary Rose Swinfen Eady (born 1 February 1964)
 Hon Katherine Anne Dorothy Swinfen Eady (born 18 May 1966)
 Hon Arabella Victoria Eleanor Swinfen Eady (born 10 March 1969)
 Charles Roger Peregrine Swinfen Eady, 4th Baron Swinfen (born 8 March 1971)

Lady Swinfen died in 2023.

Death
Swinfen died on 5 June 2022, at the age of 83.  He was succeeded in the barony by his only son, Charles.

Honours and fellowships
 UK Baron (suc. 1977) 
 MBE (2016, for "services to international telemedicine and for his work with the Swinfen Charitable Trust")
 Justice of the Peace (JP) for Kent (1983)
 Fellow, Industry and Parliament Trust (FIPT) (1983)
 Fellow, Royal Institution of Chartered Surveyors (FRICS) (1998)
 ARICS (1970)
 Hon. Research Fellow, Centre for Online Health (COH), UQ (2001)

Selected published works
An Evaluation of the First Year's Experience with a Low-cost Telemedicine Link in Bangladesh (2001)
Store-and-Forward Teleneurology in Developing Countries (2001)
Experience with a Low-cost Telemedicine System in Three Developing Countries (2001)

Arms

See also
 Baron Swinfen
 Telemedicine

References

External links
 Parliamentary profile
 Debrett's People of Today

 www.swinfencharitabletrust.org
 Swinfen Charitable Trust Newsletter

1938 births
2022 deaths
3
Conservative Party (UK) hereditary peers
People educated at Westminster School, London
Royal Scots officers
Graduates of the Royal Military Academy Sandhurst
Members of the Order of the British Empire
Hereditary peers elected under the House of Lords Act 1999